Rhinodoras armbrusteri is a species of thorny catfish known from the Takutu River and Ireng Rivers that
drains into the upper Rio Branco in Guyana and Roraima State, Brazil; it is also known from the Rupununi River  in the Essequibo River basin in southwestern Guyana.  This species grows to a length of  SL.

References 
 

Doradidae
Vertebrates of Guyana
Fish of Brazil
Fish of South America
Fish described in 2008